Malayali cartoonists are those Malayalees who draw cartoons in Malayalam language and English.

 K. Shankar Pillai
 O. V. Vijayan
 Abu Abraham
 Ravi shankar
 Yesudasan
Jitheshji
 Gopikrishnan
 P. K. Manthri
 Malayatoor Ramakrishnan
 E. P. Unni

 Sajidas mohan
Indian cartoonists
Lists of people from Kerala